Stand Together Against Neighborhood Drilling (STAND-L.A.) is an environmental justice coalition of community groups that seeks to end neighborhood drilling in Los Angeles, California. The coalition hopes to establish a human health buffer around existing oil wells in Los Angeles to protect the health and safety of Angelenos affected by urban oil extraction.

Background 

STAND-L.A. was founded in 2013 but came together officially in 2014 under the name STAND-L.A. It organizes around several urban oil sites, including the Inglewood Oil Field, Wilmington Oil Field, and Porter Ranch. These oil extraction sites operate in the neighborhoods of coalition members, their families, and their children.

STAND-L.A.’s founding members include:
 Communities for a Better Environment
 Esperanza Community Housing Corporation
 Holman United Methodist Church
 Liberty Hill Foundation
 Physicians for Social Responsibility – Los Angeles
 Redeemer Community Partnership

Issues and Campaigns

Health Impacts of Neighborhood Drilling 
The coalition focuses on raising awareness about the health and safety threats associated with neighborhood drilling and advocates for the implementation of a health and safety buffer around active oil wells in their communities.

References

Environmental organizations based in Los Angeles
Environmental justice organizations